Six ships of the Royal Navy have been named HMS Biter. Another was planned:

 was a 12-gun gunvessel launched in 1797 and sold in 1802.
 was a 12-gun gun-brig launched in 1804 and wrecked in 1805.
HMS Biter was to have been a  class wooden screw gunvessel. She was ordered in 1846 but was cancelled in 1849.
 was a  wooden screw gunboat launched in 1855. She became a coal hulk in 1865 and was later renamed T16. She was sold in 1904.
 was a tender, previously the War Department vessel Sir William Reid. She was transferred in 1905 and sold in 1923.
 was an escort carrier launched in 1940. She was transferred to the Royal Navy under lend-lease in 1942, transferred to the French Navy in 1945 and renamed Dixmude, used as an accommodation ship from 1956 and was returned to the US Navy and sunk as a target in 1966.
 is an  vessel launched in 1985 and currently in service.

Royal Navy ship names